The Longnose garter snake (Thamnophis angustirostris) is a species of snake of the family Colubridae. It is found in Mexico.

References 

Thamnophis
Reptiles described in 1860
Reptiles of Mexico